Jesse Poore Guilford (March 2, 1895 – December 1, 1962) was an American amateur golfer. He is most notable for winning the U.S. Amateur in 1921.

Guilford was born in Manchester, New Hampshire, he was the son of Robert M. Guilford and Agnes Jane Chambers. He was one of the top amateur golfers in Massachusetts, as well as the United States. His nickname was "Siege Gun" for his long drive qualities. He played on three of the first four Walker Cup teams (1922, 1924, and 1926).

The 1930 U.S. Census for Newton, Middlesex, Massachusetts, records him married to Louise B., with three daughters, Catherine, Mary L., and Jean, and son Jesse P.

Guilford died in Newton, Massachusetts.

Tournament wins
 1913 New Hampshire Amateur
 1916 Massachusetts Amateur, New Hampshire Amateur
 1917 New Hampshire Amateur
 1919 Massachusetts Open
 1921 Miami Invitational, Massachusetts Amateur, U.S. Amateur
 1923 Gold Mashie Tournament
 1924 Massachusetts Amateur
 1926 Gold Mashie Tournament
 1929 Massachusetts Open

Major championships

Amateur wins (1)

Results timeline
Guilford never played in the Masters Tournament or the British Open. As an amateur, he could not play in the PGA Championship.

M = Medalist
NT = No tournament
DNP = Did not play
DNQ = Did not qualify for match play portion
R256, R128, R64, R32, R16, QF, SF = Round in which player lost in match play
"T" indicates a tie for a place
Green background for wins. Yellow background for top-10

Source for U.S. Open & U.S. Amateur: USGA Championship Database

Source for 1921 British Amateur:  The American Golfer, June 4, 1921, pg. 24.

Source for 1926 British Amateur:  The American Golfer, July, 1926, pg. 58.

Source for 1934 British Amateur:  The Montreal Gazette, May 25, 1934, pg. 13.

U.S. national team appearances
Amateur
Walker Cup: 1922 (winners), 1924 (winners), 1926 (winners)

Notes and references

American male golfers
Amateur golfers
Golfers from New Hampshire
Golfers from Massachusetts
Sportspeople from Manchester, New Hampshire
1895 births
1962 deaths